Mihai Voduț (born 28 July 1994 in Bucharest) is a Romanian footballer who plays as a striker.

References

External links
 
 

1994 births
Living people
Footballers from Bucharest
Romanian footballers
Romania under-21 international footballers
Association football forwards
Liga I players
Liga II players
AFC Chindia Târgoviște players
FC Voluntari players
FC Viitorul Constanța players
Israeli Premier League players
Beitar Jerusalem F.C. players
Romanian expatriate footballers
Romanian expatriate sportspeople in Israel
Expatriate footballers in Israel